RNB Research is a global market research company, headquartered in New Delhi, India. RNB Research operates through its own offices in 15 cities across 10 countries - China, Egypt, GCC, India, Kenya, Philippines, Russia, South Africa, Thailand & Vietnam.

RNB Research specializes in qualitative and quantitative custom market research. It has experience in most major sectors, particularly consumer products, media, retail, financial services, food and beverages, technology, telecommunications and internet research.

RNB Research is a member of the American Marketing Association (AMA), Marketing Research Association (MRA), Council of American Survey Research Organizations (CASRO).

References

External links 
RNB Research, official website
Today's Chanakya
TodaysChanakya Twitter

Business intelligence companies
Companies based in Delhi
Companies established in 1995
Market research companies of India
Public opinion research companies
International marketing research companies